Harssh A. Singh is an Indian actor, singer, theatre personality and voice over artist. He was a Radio Jockey with Radio Mirchi (Mumbai), 98.3 fm, and was the winner of their first ever "RJ Hunt". He is known for his performance in Thappad (2020), Kabir Singh (2019), Raman Raghav 2.0 (2016) and in the Amazon Prime Video original series Bandish Bandits (2020) Directed by Anand Tiwari.

In April 2021, he joined the cast of Sony Entertainment Television show Kyun Utthe Dil Chhod Aaye (2021).

Early life and career
Harssh was born on 23 September 1970, in Ludhiana, Punjab. He finished his schooling at the Sacred Heart Convent. He moved to Mumbai to be an actor and a singer, and during a chance audition bagged the post of Radio Jockey on Radio Mirchi.

He pursued theatre alongside, and has worked with personalities such as Alyque padamsee, Jehan Manekshaw, Quasar Padamsee and Vikram Kapadia.

He has worked in several films, including Bajrangi Bhaijaan with Kabir Khan, Brothers with Karan Malhotra and Raman Raghav 2.0 with Anurag Kashyap, as well as Kabir Singh with Sandeep Vanga.

Filmography

Films

As director
 Grand Plan (2017) - Short Film

Television
 Sense8 (2015)
 Bose: Dead or Alive (2017) as Ram Murthi
 Romil & Jugal (2017) as Jindal Kohli
 Ragini MMS: Returns (2017) as Principal Rajat Kapoor
 Bhak (2019) as Ramesh Nair
 Mission Over Mars (2019) as Ananth Vardhan
 Bandish Bandits (2020) as Suryasen
 Kyun Utthe Dil Chhod Aaye (2021–present)

Theatre 
 QTPs Project S.T.R.I.P (2012) as Captain Roy
 Jesus Christ Superstar (2015) as King Herod
 Gandhi (2016) - The Musical as Harilal

Discography
 Never Be Friends (2020) - Single

Awards

References

External links
 
 

Living people
1970 births
Indian male film actors
Indian male stage actors
Indian radio presenters
21st-century Indian male actors